Dissanayaka Mudiyanselage Jayaratne (4 June 1931 – 19 November 2019), known as D. M. "Di Mu" Jayaratne, was a veteran Sri Lankan politician who was Prime Minister of Sri Lanka from 2010 to 2015. A founding member of the Sri Lanka Freedom Party, Jayaratne was first elected to parliament in 1970. He was sworn in as Prime Minister on 21 April 2010.

Early life
D. M. Jayaratne was born on 4 June 1931. He was educated at Doluwa Maha Vidyalaya and at Zahira College in Gampola, a town just outside Kandy. Following the founding of the Sri Lanka Freedom Party in Kandy in 1951 by S. W. R. D. Bandaranaike, Jayaratne worked as a teacher at Doluwa Maha Vidyalaya. He later worked as Postmaster at Doluwa from 1960 to 1962.

Political career
Jayaratne started his political career having been elected a member of the Village Council of Doluwa, where he later became the Chairman of the Village Council. He also become the President of the Kandy District Village Council Chairmen Association and a Member of the Federation of All Ceylon Village Council.

He first entered parliament following the 1970 general election, obtaining 14,463 votes as the Sri Lanka Freedom Party (SLFP) candidate in the Gampola electorate, and defeating W.P.B. Dissanayake of the United National Party (UNP). He was subsequently defeated by Dissanayake in the 1977 election in which just 8 members of the SLFP were returned to parliament. He was again re-elected to parliament in 1989 from the Kandy District under the new preferential voting system. He obtained 54,290 preferential votes, topping the SLFP list in the Kandy District.

Re-elected to parliament under the People's Alliance in 1994, Jayaratne was appointed Minister of Land, Agriculture and Forestry by President Chandrika Kumaratunga, entering the cabinet for the first time. He held several senior party positions such as Secretary General of People's United Front and Senior Vice President of Sri Lanka Freedom Party. Ministerial appointments he held included:

 Minister of Lands, Agriculture, Forestry and Livestock (1994)
 Minister of Agriculture, Land and Forestry (1997)
 Minister of Agriculture and Land (1999)
 Minister of Agriculture (2000)
 Minister of Agriculture Land Forestry Food and Cooperative Development (2001 Probationary Government)
 Minister of Post and Communication (2004 while being in the Opposition)
 Minister of Post and Telecommunication (2004)
 Minister of Telecommunication and Rural Economic Promotion (2005)
 Minister of Telecommunication and Upcountry Development (2006)
 Minister of Plantation Industries (2007)

Prime Minister
Following the election victory of the United People's Freedom Alliance at the 2010 general election, Jayaratne, the most senior member of the SLFP, was sworn in as Prime Minister on 21 April 2010. Under the constitution of Sri Lanka, the role of Prime Minister is largely a ceremonial post. Along with it, he also held the Ministry of Buddha Sasana (Buddhism) and Religious Affairs.

Personal life
Jayaratne had three children. His youngest Anuradha Jayaratne, is a former State Minister and current member of parliament, his daughter is a graduate from Manipal University, Manipal campus, India.

See also
List of political families in Sri Lanka
Cabinet of Sri Lanka

References

1931 births
2019 deaths
Government ministers of Sri Lanka
Members of the 7th Parliament of Ceylon
Members of the 9th Parliament of Sri Lanka
Members of the 10th Parliament of Sri Lanka
Members of the 11th Parliament of Sri Lanka
Members of the 12th Parliament of Sri Lanka
Members of the 13th Parliament of Sri Lanka
Members of the 14th Parliament of Sri Lanka
Prime Ministers of Sri Lanka
Sri Lankan Buddhists
Sri Lanka Freedom Party politicians
United People's Freedom Alliance politicians
People from British Ceylon
Posts ministers of Sri Lanka
Telecommunication ministers of Sri Lanka
Sinhalese politicians
Sinhalese teachers
Postmasters